Bury Hebrew Congregation, also known as Bet Knesset Sha'ar HahShamayim (Gate of Heaven Synagogue) is an Orthodox synagogue, serving the Jewish community in the Sunnybank, Unsworth and Hollins area of North Manchester.

History 
As with other cities, the original immigrant community in Manchester gradually moved outward geographically and upward economically from its roots in the inner city, establishing itself in the more open suburbs of Prestwich, Crumpsall and Broughton Park.  The Bury community is a result of a second generation migration of young families in the mid-1960s who sought new lives away from these established and traditional areas.

At that time, Sunnybank was very much a green-field site, recently developed on land adjacent to Manchester Road, the A56, much of which had, at one time, been farm or grazing land.

By 1964 there was a sizeable community, and a meeting was held at Blackford Bridge Reform Church. Plans were laid to purchase land to build a small synagogue. A committee was formed with the first elected president Mr. Sidney Goldstone; vice-president Mr. Louis Ingleby, treasurer Mr. Issy Hymanson, warden Mr. Gerald Taylor, and secretaries Mr. Eddie Glass and Mr. Aubrey Taylor.

In the meantime, prayers took place in members' homes until June 18, 1965, when a prefabricated building was purchased and services began to take place there, and soon after the first minister of the synagogue was appointed, Rev. David Grunsfeld, who ran services and also taught at the cheder, (Jewish studies school).

By 1975, the prefab complex was no longer adequate, and a permanent building was suggested. Funds were collected and in 1976, the new building, which is still in use today, was opened by the then Chief Rabbi, Immanuel Jakobovits.

In 1982, Rev. Grunsfeld left, and was replaced by Rabbi Moshe Fine, who served for three years, until he was replaced by Rabbi Binyomin Singer, who is the present minister.

Facilities 
The synagogue buildings, opened in 1976, are the focal point of a community of over 350 families and provide a centre for daily religious observance, functions, family events, clubs, education and youth groups.

The complex, situated on the corner of Sunnybank Road and Manchester Road, includes the Sunnybank Suite, comprising a large function hall (approx 200 seated for a meal), reception room (in memory of Eli and Edith Morris), a full fitted meat and milk kitchen and a recently refurbished bridal room.  There is a large main synagogue on the ground floor, a Beit Hamedrash on the first floor and a large library of Judaica and other books of Jewish literature.

Recent events

1998: Beit Hamedrash 

In 1998, the Beit Hamedrash and study hall were opened. The study hall serves for weekday prayer services, small functions and the SEED study programme. It is also here that an extensive library is housed.

The new extension was opened the Hebrew date of 30th Nissan 5758 (26 April 1998) by Dayan Krausz of the Manchester Beth Din and dedicated by Mr. and Mrs. Brian Rose, members of the synagogue, in memory of their son, David, who died of Tay–Sachs disease.

2000: New Sefer Torah 
On September 10, 2000 the synagogue dedicated a Sefer Torah in memory of its late warden, Sol Weinstock. After the completion of the writing of the new scroll at Bury and Whitefield Jewish Primary School, a procession escorted the scroll to the synagogue where it was installed amidst celebrations, and where it is now used weekly for the reading of the portion of the Law.

References

External links
Official website
Bury Hebrew Congregation on Jewish Communities and Records – UK (hosted by jewishgen.org).

Synagogues in Manchester
Bury, Greater Manchester
Religion in Greater Manchester
Orthodox synagogues in England